Boulengerina is a genus or subgenus of elapid venomous snakes known commonly as water cobras, so named because of their semiaquatic nature. The genus has two recognised species, which are native to central and southern Africa.

Taxonomy
Some recent molecular studies have suggested that the genus Boulengerina should be synonymised with the genus Naja, because the water cobras are closely related to some species of Naja.

Wallach, Wüster and Broadley, re-ranked Boulengerina as a subgenus within Naja comprising the two species already recognised as forming genus Boulengerina plus Naja melanoleuca, as Naja (Boulengerina) melanoleuca, and the species formerly known as Paranaja multifasciata, now Naja (Boulengerina) multifasciata.

Etymology
The generic name, Boulengerina, is in honor of Belgian-born British herpetologist George Albert Boulenger.

Species
Boulengerina annulata  – ringed water cobra
Boulengerina christyi  – Christy's water cobra

Nota bene: A binomial authority in parentheses indicates that the species was originally described in a genus other than Boulengerina.

Geographic distribution
B. annulata – Cameroon, Gabon, Republic of Congo, Democratic Republic of Congo, Central African Republic, Tanzania, Equatorial Guinea, Rwanda, Burundi, and Zambia.
B. christyi – Republic of Congo, Democratic Republic of Congo.

See also
False water cobra, Hydrodynastes gigas

References

External links

 
Snake genera
Taxa named by Louis Dollo
Animal subgenera